Animes Roy is a Bangladeshi music composer, singer, and songwriter. He works on folk music, Hajong language music. He is also featured artist on Coke Studio Bangla.

Early life
Animes Roy was born on 14 November 1996 into a Hajong Hindu family in the Bagajhara village of Dhubaura, Mymensingh District. His father, Arbinda Roy is a village doctor, and his mother Kalyani Roy is a housewife. He completed his graduation from the Department of Music at Jatiya Kabi Kazi Nazrul Islam University.

Discography
 Mon Bhala Na Re Tor Pirit Bhala Na
 Amar Nirob Kanna 
 Joler Titir
 Nasek Nasek

References 

Living people
People from Mymensingh District
21st-century Bangladeshi musicians
1996 births
People from Mymensingh Division
Hajong people
Bangladeshi Hindus
Jatiya Kabi Kazi Nazrul Islam University alumni